Queensland Country is an Australian rugby union football team that competes in the National Rugby Championship (NRC). The team is one of two Queensland sides in the competition, the other being . Queensland Country is organised and managed by the Queensland Rugby Union (QRU), with the coaching and training programs used at the Queensland Reds extended to players joining the team from the Reds, Premier and Country rugby teams.

The Queensland Country team in the NRC draws its identity from the Queensland Country representative team that has played in regular City-Country fixtures in Queensland since 1902. The same colours have been adopted for the team in the NRC competition and, while the Heelers' cattle dog logo is not used, an emblem based on the traditional Cooktown Orchid logo of the Queensland Country Rugby Union has been adopted. The Queensland Country uniform is blue and white, with a crest of the orchid logo inside Queensland Rugby's traditional 'Q' on the jersey's chest.

The NRC was launched in 2014, reinstating the national competition after the Australian Rugby Championship (ARC) was discontinued following the first season in 2007. The Queensland Country NRC team plays in various Queensland regional centres. Existing QRU staffing roles and infrastructure are utilised, and the training base for the team is at QRU's headquarters at Ballymore.

History
Rugby within Country Queensland began to gain significant popular support after the first intercolonial match between New South Wales and Queensland in 1882. Prior to this, Melbourne rules (Australian football) was more often played. Regional centres such as Toowoomba, Rockhampton, Maryborough and Charters Towers established their own rugby unions in the 1880s and 1890s.

Representative team

The first City-Country match between Brisbane and Queensland Country (selected from the rest of Queensland) was held at the inaugural Country Week carnival hosted by the QRU in 1902. Despite several successful seasons, the Country Week carnivals ceased following the rise of rugby league after 1909. The start of the First World War brought rugby union to a halt in Queensland after 1914. Although the QRU was eventually revived in 1928–29, rugby languished in country regions of the state for many decades.

City-Country matches were resumed in 1965. From 1968 until 1982, annual Country Carnival competitions were held from which the Country team was selected to play Brisbane and other representative sides. The Country Carnival was discontinued in favour of State Championships in 1983. While the format of competition has varied over time, City-Country matches between the Brisbane and Queensland Country representative teams have remained regular fixtures since.

East Coast Aces (ARC team)

In 2006, after setting up a consultative process culminating in a working session of some 70 delegates from around the country, the Australian Rugby Union announced that a new, eight-team national competition would commence in 2007 to compete for the Australian Rugby Championship (ARC).

The East Coast Aces, based on the Gold Coast, was formed as one of two Queensland teams supported by the QRU in the ARC, alongside the Ballymore Tornadoes. The Chairman of the Steering Committee for the Aces said that the team had selected a name that would embrace the various stakeholders at club level. He added:

Queensland's two teams in the ARC were aligned with existing clubs and regions. The East Coast Aces team was aligned with Queensland Country and the Queensland Premier Rugby clubs south of the Brisbane River – Souths, Easts, Sunnybank, and Gold Coast. The Aces played home matches at Carrara Stadium on the Gold Coast. The QRU had initially considered basing the team out of Ballymore, before settling on the Gold Coast. The Aces' colours were black, blue and gold.

The head coach of the Aces was John Boe, who was also head coach of the Gold Coast Breakers - one of the Ace's feeder teams. Boe was a former All Black and World Cup coach (leading Samoa at the 2003 tournament) and a previous assistant coach at both the Chiefs and the Highlanders. The assistant coach for the Aces was former Wallaby Garrick Morgan.

The Australian Rugby Championship was terminated at the end of 2007 after only one season of competition, with the Australian Rugby Union citing higher costs than budgeted and further projected financial losses. The Aces team was disbanded at the end of the ARC. The team had incurred significant financial losses, with an average home attendance for the season of just 1,428, the lowest in the ARC.

National Rugby Championship

In December 2013, the ARU announced that the national competition was to be relaunched, with the National Rugby Championship (NRC) commencing in 2014. Expressions of interest were open to any interested parties, with the accepted bids finalised in early 2014. There was initial interest from Queensland clubs and regions in forming NRC teams themselves, but to eliminate the risks to sub-unions and clubs, the Queensland Rugby Union decided to organise and manage two teams centrally in the early years of the competition. On 24 March 2014, it was announced that the Queensland Country and Brisbane City teams would play in the NRC competition.

Anthony Fainga'a was Queensland Country's captain for the inaugural season in 2014. Fainga'a was initially named as captain again for the following season but he was forced out through injury and James Tuttle became the captain for 2015.

Sponsors
Queensland Country secured Bond University as principal partner in 2014, with the team officially known as Bond University Queensland Country.

Home grounds

The Queensland Country team has its training base at Ballymore in Brisbane, the traditional home of Queensland Rugby. The team has scheduled home matches at the following locations:

Current squad
The squad for the 2019 NRC season:

Records

Honours
National Rugby Championship
Champions:  2017
Runners-up: 2018

Season standings
National Rugby Championship
{| class="wikitable" style="text-align:center;"
|- border=1 cellpadding=5 cellspacing=0
! style="width:20px;"|Year
! style="width:20px;"|Pos
! style="width:20px;"|Pld
! style="width:20px;"|W
! style="width:20px;"|D
! style="width:20px;"|L
! style="width:20px;"|F
! style="width:20px;"|A
! style="width:25px;"|+/-
! style="width:20px;"|BP
! style="width:20px;"|Pts
! style="width:25em; text-align:left;"|  Play-offs
|-
|2018
|2nd
| 7 || 5 || 0 || 2 || 299 || 211 || +88 || 4 || 24
|align=left|  Grand final loss to Fijian Drua by 36–26
|-
|2017
|2nd
| 8 || 6 || 0 || 2 || 316 || 204 ||+112 || 5 || 29
|-
|2016
|8th
| 7 || 1 || 0 || 6 || 248 || 346 || −98 || 3 || 7
|align=left|  Did not compete
|-
|2015
|8th
|| 8 || 2 || 0 || 6 || 230 || 336 || −106 || 1 || 9
|align=left|  Did not compete
|-
|2014
|8th
|| 8 || 2 || 0 || 6 || 208 || 281 || −73  || 3 || 11
|align=left|  Did not compete
|}

Australian Rugby Championship (Aces)
{| class="wikitable"
|- border=1 cellpadding=5 cellspacing=0
! style="width:20px;"|Year
! style="width:20px;"|Pos
! style="width:20px;"|Pld
! style="width:20px;"|W
! style="width:20px;"|D
! style="width:20px;"|L
! style="width:20px;"|F
! style="width:20px;"|A
! style="width:25px;"|+/-
! style="width:20px;"|BP
! style="width:20px;"|Pts
! style="width:25em; text-align:left;"|  Play-offs
|- align=center
|align=left|2007
|align=left|8th
| 8 || 2 || 0 || 6 || 163 || 343 || −180 || 3 || 11
|align=left|  Did not compete
|}

Squads
{| class="collapsible collapsed" style=" width: 100%; margin: 0px; border: 1px solid darkgray; border-spacing: 3px;"
|-
! colspan="10" style="background-color:#f2f2f2; cell-border:2px solid black; padding-left: 1em; padding-right: 1em; text-align: center;" |2016 Queensland Country squad – NRC
|-
|colspan="10"|The squad for the 2016 National Rugby Championship season:

|-
| width="3%"| 
| width="30%" style="font-size: 95%;" valign="top"|

Props
 Richie Asiata
 Ben Daley
 Sef Fa'agase
 Kirwan Sanday
 James Slipper1
 Taniela Tupou

Hookers
 Alex Casey
 Saia Fainga'a
 Feleti Kaitu’u
 Stephen Moore1

Locks
 Tyrell Barker
 Phil Potgieter
 Izack Rodda
 Rob Simmons1
 Brad Thorn

| width="3%"| 
| width="30%" style="font-size: 95%;" valign="top"|

Loose Forwards
 Jack Cornelsen
 Lolo Fakaosilea
 Maclean Jones
 Conor Mitchell
 Apisai Naiyabo
 Angus Scott-Young

Scrum-halves
 Issak Fines-Leleiwasa
 Scott Malolua
 James Tuttle (c)

Fly-halves
 Mack Mason
 Mitch Third

| width="3%"| 
| width="30%" style="font-size: 95%;" valign="top"|

Centres
 Joshua Birch
 Matt Gordon
 Campbell Magnay
 Duncan Paia'aua

Wingers
 Tyrone Lefau
 Eto Nabuli
 Izaia Perese
 Tom Pincus

Fullbacks
 Tom Banks
 Liam McNamara

Notes:(c) Team captainBold denotes internationally capped players at the time1 National player additional to contracted squad.
|}

{| class="collapsible collapsed" style=" width: 100%; margin: 0px; border: 1px solid darkgray; border-spacing: 3px;"
|-
! colspan="10" style="background-color:#f2f2f2; cell-border:2px solid black; padding-left: 1em; padding-right: 1em; text-align: center;" |2015 Queensland Country squad – NRC
|-
|colspan="10"|The squad for the 2015 National Rugby Championship season:

|-
| width="3%"| 
| width="30%" style="font-size: 95%;" valign="top"|

Props
 Sef Fa'agase
 Haydn Hirsimaki
 Taniela Tupou
 Greg Holmes
 Andrew Parker 
 James Slipper1

Hookers
 Saia Fainga'a
 Alex Mafi
 Tonga Ma’afu
 Campbell Wakely

Locks
 Lukhan Tui
 Richie Arnold
 Phil Potgieter
 Cameron Bracewell
 Rob Simmons1

| width="3%"| 
| width="30%" style="font-size: 95%;" valign="top"|

Loose Forwards
 Jack Cornelson
 James Turner
 Conor Mitchell
 Ed Quirk
 Radike Samo
 Lolo Fakaosilea

Scrum-halves
 Scott Gale
 Harry Nucifora
 James Tuttle (c)

Fly-halves
 Sam Greene
 Duncan Paia'aua
 Dion Taumata

| width="3%"| 
| width="30%" style="font-size: 95%;" valign="top"|

Centres
 Anthony Fainga'a
 Campbell Magnay
 Stephan van der Walt

Wingers
 Matt Gordon
 Izaia Perese
 Chris Feauai-Sautia
 Elliot Hagen

Fullbacks
 Tom Banks
 Jamie-Jerry Taulagi

Notes:(c) Team captainBold denotes internationally capped players at the time1 National player additional to contracted squad.
|}

{| class="collapsible collapsed" style=" width: 100%; margin: 0px; border: 1px solid darkgray; border-spacing: 3px;"
|-
! colspan="10" style="background-color:#f2f2f2; cell-border:2px solid black; padding-left: 1em; padding-right: 1em; text-align: center;" |2014 Queensland Country squad – NRC
|-
|colspan="10"|The squad for the 2014 National Rugby Championship season:

|-
| width="3%"| 
| width="30%" style="font-size: 95%;" valign="top"|

Props
 Fred Burke
 Haydn Hirsimaki
 Greg Holmes
 Kirwan Sanday
 James Slipper

Hookers
 Saia Fainga'a
 Ryan Freney
 Tonga Ma’afu

Locks
 Cameron Bracewell
 Blake Enever
 Sam Fattal
 Rubin Fuimaono
 Jack Payne
 Rob Simmons

| width="3%"| 
| width="30%" style="font-size: 95%;" valign="top"|

Loose Forwards
 Ben Adams
 Jack de Guingand
 Lolo Fakasilea
 Mitch King
 Beau Robinson
 James Turner

Scrum-halves
 Scott Gale
 Sam Grasso

Fly-halves
 Matt Brandon
 Mike Harris
 James Tuttle

| width="3%"| 
| width="30%" style="font-size: 95%;" valign="top"|

Centres
 Anthony Fainga'a (c)
 Sam Johnson
 Clynton Knox
 Campbell Magnay
 Uarotafu Setu

Wingers
 Giles Beveridge
 Pierce Fitzgerald
 Todd Winkley

Fullbacks
 Ben Lucas
 Tom Pincus
 Jamie-Jerry Taulagi

Notes:(c) Team captainBold denotes internationally capped players at the time1 National player additional to contracted squad.
|}

{| class="collapsible collapsed" style=" width: 100%; margin: 0px; border: 1px solid darkgray; border-spacing: 3px;"
|-
! colspan="10" style="background-color:#f2f2f2; cell-border:2px solid black; padding-left: 1em; padding-right: 1em; text-align: center;" |2007 East Coast Aces squad – ARC
|-
| width="3%"| 
| width="30%" style="font-size: 95%;" valign="top"|

Props
 Lloyd Campbell-McBride
 Tama Tuirirangi
 Ben Coutts
 Joe Tufuga

Hookers
 Jade Ingham
 Ole Avei

Locks
 Will Munsie
 Luke Caughley
 Rob Simmons

| width="3%"| 
| width="30%" style="font-size: 95%;" valign="top"|

Back row
 Ben Mowen
 Daniel Ese
 A.J. Gilbert
 Josh Afu

Halfbacks
 Nic Berry
 Sam Batty

Flyhalves
 Ben Lucas
 Quade Cooper

| width="3%"| 
| width="30%" style="font-size: 95%;" valign="top"|

Centres
 Lloyd Johansson
 Waitai Walker
 Charlie Fetoai
 Henari Veratau

Wings
 Caleb Brown
 Brett Stapleton

Fullbacks
 Chris Latham
 Andrew Walker
 Marshall Milroy
 John Dart

Notes:(c) Team captainBold denotes internationally capped players at the time
|}

See also

 Queensland Reds
 Queensland Premier Rugby
 Rugby union in Queensland
 Combined New South Wales–Queensland Country

References

Sources

External links
Queensland Country official web page
NRC on redsrugby.com 
Queensland Country on twitter.com

National Rugby Championship
Rugby union teams in Queensland
Rugby clubs established in 2014
2014 establishments in Australia
Rugby union clubs disestablished in 2020
2020 disestablishments in Australia